Riolama leucosticta, the white-spotted riolama, is a species of lizard in the family Gymnophthalmidae. It is endemic to Venezuela.

References

Riolama
Reptiles of Venezuela
Endemic fauna of Venezuela
Reptiles described in 1900
Taxa named by George Albert Boulenger